Roman Nikolayevich Romanov (born 5 February 1981) is a Russian former professional footballer.

Club career
He made his professional debut in the Russian Second Division in 1998 for FC Rotor-2 Volgograd.

He made his Russian Premier League debut for FC Rotor Volgograd on 29 July 2000 in a game against FC Lokomotiv Moscow.

References

1981 births
People from Volzhsky, Volgograd Oblast
Living people
Russian footballers
Russia under-21 international footballers
Association football defenders
Russian Premier League players
FC Rotor Volgograd players
FC Luch Vladivostok players
FC Energiya Volzhsky players
FC Zenit-2 Saint Petersburg players
Sportspeople from Volgograd Oblast